The Meeting Città di Padova is an annual track and field meet that takes place at the Daciano Colbacchini Stadium in Padua, Italy. It was first held in 1987. From 1993 to 2018 the meeting was moved to the Stadio Euganeo until the Daciano Colbacchini Stadium reopened the doors to athletics.

Meeting records

Men

Women

References

External links
Official website
Meeting records

European Athletic Association meetings
Recurring sporting events established in 1987